Cabinet Kraft II was the name of the government of the German state of North Rhine-Westphalia from June 2012 until June 2017.

Its leader is Minister-President Hannelore Kraft. Kraft was reelected by the Landtag of North Rhine-Westphalia on 20 June 2012. She has already led the previous government. Kraft's government is a coalition between the Social Democratic Party of Germany (SPD) and The Greens. There were only little changes from the previous government to this one.

The following table shows cabinet members, who hold the office of ministers of their respective portfolio except when denoted otherwise. Note that only the Ministers are members of the Cabinet. The Head of the Minister-President's Office, as a Secretary of State, is not an official member of cabinet, but is invited as non-voting attendee.

Kraft II
2012 establishments in Germany
2017 disestablishments in Germany